An election to the Carmarthenshire County Council was held in April 1955. It was preceded by the 1952 election and followed, by the 1958 election.

Overview of the result

After six years under Labour control, the election produced a very close result with 29 Labour candidates, 28 Independents and 2 Plaid Cymru candidates being returned after the contested elections. With the support of the two Plaid Cymru members, the Independents then proceeded to take seven of the eight aldermanic vacancies and to offer the other to the President of Plaid Cymru, Gwynfor Evans with the result that the Independent group regained control of the authority.

Boundary changes

There were no boundary changes at this election.

Retiring aldermen

The aldermen who retired at the election were ...

A number of retiring councilors stood down to allow retiring aldermen to be returned unopposed. These included the members for Kidwelly, Llanelly Division 2, 6 and 7, Pontyberem and Westfa. Four of these members would not be returned to the new council the aldermen were not re-elected. At Llansawel, Alderman David Thomas withdrew rather than face a contest.

Unopposed returns

39 members were returned unopposed, an increase of five compared with 1955.

Contested elections

20 seats were contested. Labour defeats at St Ishmaels and one of the Llanelli wards, to Independents, and at Ammanford, to Plaid Cymru, led to their losing their majority of elected councillors.

A number of retiring aldermen stood as candidates and were returned unopposed.

Summary of results

This section summarises the detailed results which are noted in the following sections.

This table summarises the result of the elections in all wards. 59 councillors were elected.

|}

|}

|}

Ward results

Abergwili

Ammanford No.1

Ammanford No.2

Berwick

Burry Port East

Burry Port West

Caio

Carmarthen Division 1

Carmarthen Division 2

Carmarthen Division 3

Cenarth

Cilycwm

Conwil

Cwmamman

Felinfoel

Hengoed

Kidwelly

Laugharne

Llanarthney

Llanboidy

Llandebie North

Llandebie South

Llandilo Rural

Llandilo Urban

Llandovery

Llandyssilio

Llanedy

Llanegwad

Llanelly Division.1

Llanelly Division 2

Llanelly Division 3

Llanelly Division 4

Llanelly Division 5

Llanelly Division 6

Llanelly Division 7

Llanelly Division 8

Llanelly Division 9

Llanfihangel Aberbythick

Llanfihangel-ar-Arth

Llangadog

Llangeler

Llangendeirne

Llangennech

Llangunnor

Llanon

Llansawel

Llanstephan

Llanybyther

Myddfai

Pembrey

Pontyberem

Quarter Bach

Rhydcymerau

St Clears

St Ishmaels

Trelech

Trimsaran

Westfa

Whitland

Election of aldermen

In addition to the 59 councillors the council consisted of 19 county aldermen. Aldermen were elected by the council, and served a six-year term. Following the elections, seven of the ten aldermanic vacancies were taken by the Independents and an eighth by Gwynfor Evans of Plaid Cymru, whose two representatives aligned with the Independents to guarantee their majority.

 J.M. Davies, Independent
 Thomas Davies, Independent
 Griffith Evans, Independent
 Gwynfor R. Evans, Plaid Cymru
 W.H. Mathias, Independent
 J.O. Morgans, Independent
 S.O. Thomas, Independent
 T.J. Williams, Independent 
 Emrys Aubrey, Labour
 W. Douglas Hughes, Labour

By-elections
Following the selection of aldermen the following by-elections were held.

Caio by-election

Carmarthen Division 2 by-election

Llandeilo Urban by-election

Llanegwad by-election

Llanelly Division 6 by-election

Llanfihangel Aberbythych by-election

Llangadog by-election

Trelech by-election

Westfa by-election

Whitland by-election

References

Carmarthenshire County Council elections
Carmarthenshire County Council election
Carmarthenshire County Council election